In Māori tradition, Ngātokimatawhaorua or Matawhaorua was one of the great ocean-going, voyaging canoes that was used in the migrations that settled New Zealand.

Matawhaorua was the canoe of Kupe, the Polynesian discoverer of the islands now known as New Zealand.

On Kupe's return to Hawaiki, it was re-adzed and renamed Ngātokimatawhaorua ("ngā toki" translating as "the adzes").

Ngā Toki Matawhaorua, a waka built in 1940 at the instigation of Te Puea Herangi for the centenary of the signing of the Treaty of Waitangi, is named after Matawhaorua.

See also
List of Māori waka

References

Māori waka
Māori mythology
Hokianga